Şahinbey Mülk, or simply Mülk, is a village in the Şahinbey District, Gaziantep Province, Turkey. The village had a population of 408 in 2022.

References

Villages in Şahinbey District